Epik High (Hangul: 에픽하이) is a South Korean hip-hop trio formed in 2001, composed of Tablo, Mithra Jin, and DJ Tukutz. Primarily based in Seoul, the group signed with Woollim Entertainment and released their first two studio albums, Map of the Human Soul (2003) and High Society (2004), to minor success. The trio rose to fame with the release of their follow-up studio albums, Swan Songs (2005), Remapping the Human Soul (2007), and Pieces, Part One (2008), spawning the hit singles "Fly", "Paris", "Fan", "Love Love Love", "One" and "Umbrella". Although the majority of these albums were censored by the Ministry of Culture and Tourism due to themes of crimes, war, religion, and education, Epik High established themselves as one of the leading hip-hop artists in the country, gaining a cult following and critical plaudit.

Following the completion of mandatory military services and their exclusive contract with Woollim Entertainment, Epik High signed with YG Entertainment in 2012. The trio's next studio albums, 99 (2012),  Shoebox (2014), and We've Done Something Wonderful (2017), explored heartbreaks, personal struggles, and self-help. Supported by the successful singles "It's Cold", "Up", "Born Hater", "Spoiler", "Happen Ending", "Love Story" and "Home Is Far Away", Epik High garnered international recognition, becoming the first central South Korean act to play at Coachella.

Epik High left YG Entertainment in 2018 and signed with record label Ours Co, under William Morris Endeavor, the following year. They released their second extended play Sleepless in __ in 2019, followed by a two-part tenth studio album, Epik High Is Here (2021 & 2022).

History

2001–2005: Career beginnings and breakthrough
Epik High was formed in 2001 upon frontman Tablo's return to South Korea after being educated in Vancouver and Stanford. With the addition of Mithra Jin and DJ Tukutz, the group made their beginnings in the underground hip hop scene in Seoul, performing with other Korean hip hop groups such as CB Mass and as part of the "Movement Crew," one of the most prominent hip-hop crews of the time in South Korea.

As the genre was unpopular among mainstream audiences, the group was relatively unknown early on in their career, with critics seeing the little market for "lyrically complex music" that did not match the K-pop scene of the time. Their first performance was to a small audience at the amusement park Everland in 2002. They released their debut album, Map of the Human Soul, under Woollim Entertainment in 2003, and began to gain success with the release of their second album, High Society (2004).

Swan Songs was intended to be Epik High's final album, following the poor performance of their previous two releases; however, it became a mainstream hit and made them one of the most popular hip-hop groups in Korea. The album was a chart success with the title track, "Fly," reaching number one on domestic charts. "Fly" also featured on the soundtracks for FIFA 07 and  Pump It Up. Another of the album tracks, "Paris" featuring Loveholics' Jisun, was also a hit in Japan and Korea. The album was repackaged the following year as Black Swan Songs, which included remixes of several tracks.

2006–2009: Continued success
Originally set for release in October 2006, Epik High's fourth album Remapping the Human Soul was released on January 23, 2007. The two upbeat lead singles, "Fan" and "Love Love Love," were hits, while the rest of the album had darker undertones and tackled diverse themes including sex crimes, war, religion, and education. The Ministry of Culture and Tourism reportedly censored the album due to its lyrical and thematic content. Despite this, it was a commercial success in both Korea and Japan. It went on to sell 120,301 copies during the Year, making it the third best-selling album of 2007 in South Korea. During this time, the group spoke of their "no genre, just music" philosophy, expressing frustration with "narrow," "out-dated and isolated" perceptions of the hip hop genre.

Over 50,000 copies of their fifth studio album entitled Pieces, Part One was pre-ordered before its release in April 2008. The album's release was followed by music videos for the singles "One," "Breakdown," and "Umbrella." After the album's success, Epik High released the EP Lovescream to acclaim in October, with the EP's title track "1 Minute 1 Second" topping online music charts. In early 2009, Epik High parted ways with Woollim Entertainment and founded Map The Soul, an independent record label that consisted of Epik High, MYK, Planet Shiver, and Dok2. They released their seventh work, a "book album" entitled 魂: Map the Soul, on March 27 and distributed it exclusively on Epik High's website. Tablo stated that 魂: Map the Soul is not the group's official sixth album but a particular project.

Music videos for the single "Map the Soul" were released on May 19, with worldwide and Korean versions. To commemorate their first release under the independent label, Epik High toured in Japan and performed at Melon Ax in Seoul with Kero One and MYK. That month, they also served in various cities in the US (New York City, Los Angeles, San Francisco, and Seattle) along with Dumbfoundead, Kero One, MYK, and Far East Movement. On July 22, Epik High and Map the Soul signed with electronic group Planet Shiver and released the remix album Remixing The Human Soul.

Epik High's sixth album, [e], was released on September 16 with the title single "Wannabe (따라해)" featuring Mellow, an electronic pop track critiquing K-pop trends. The studio album contained 30 tracks in a 2-CD format. Its release was followed by a South Korean tour, beginning on September 19.

2010–2012: Epilogue, military service, and hiatus
On October 15, 2009, DJ Tukutz enlisted for two years in mandatory military service, two days after his marriage. He was discharged in August 2011.

While DJ Tukutz was conscripted into the army, Epik High's seventh studio album, Epilogue, was released under Woollim Entertainment on March 9, 2010, to chart success. The music video for its title track, "Run," featured several members of the Woollim-signed boy band Infinite before their debut: L as the video's protagonist, Sunggyu as a guitarist, Woohyun as bassist, and Sungjong as keyboardist. In addition, infinite's Hoya and Dongwoo also served as backup dancers during promotions of the single on various music shows.

Shortly after the album's release, Mithra Jin also entered mandatory military service and served two years between August 3, 2010 – May 14, 2012. He joined the 102 reserves in Chuncheon and served as an infantry rifle soldier, a member of the military band, and a GOP soldier before settling at the Defense Media Agency (DEMA).

During the two-year hiatus that followed, Tablo (who is a Canadian citizen and therefore was not required to carry out military service) signed a four-year contract with YG Entertainment and released a solo album titled Fever's End on November 1, 2011. However, he indicated that Epik High had not disbanded.

In July 2012, it was confirmed that Epik High would return as a group under YG Entertainment after a three-year hiatus. On October 9, the group released the single "It's Cold" featuring the newly signed Lee Hi, to chart success. They digitally released the album 99, as well as music videos for the tracks "Up" (featuring Park Bom) and "Don't Hate Me," on October 19. The album was physically released on October 23 with two extra tracks, not on the digital release. During the SBS Gayo Daejeon on December 30 they joined Dynamic Duo and Simon D for "Cypher 2012", a remix of popular hip-hop tracks of the Year to much acclaim.

2013–2017: 10th anniversary and worldwide recognition

On October 23, 2013, Epik High released the single "420" featuring Double K, Yankie, Dok2, Sean2Slow, Dumbfoundead, TopBob, and MYK to celebrate their tenth anniversary.

On May 18, 2014, they released the single "With You" in collaborating with Chinese Singer Bibi Zhou, as a re-recording of "Fool" (originally featuring Bumkey) from their previous album Epilogue. On October 18, YG Entertainment released the music video for the pre-release track "Born Hater" featuring a line-up of noted rappers. Epik High's eighth studio album,  Shoebox, was physically released on October 22 and met with critical praise for the emotion and complex lyrical content of lead singles "Happen Ending" and "Spoiler" as well as other tracks including "Burj Khalifa" and "Amor Fati."

In March 2015, Epik High performed at SXSW in Austin, Texas. In April 2016, they became the first-ever Korean act to perform at the Coachella music festival, where their performance was well received by audiences. On October 23, 2017, they released We've Done Something Wonderful, their ninth studio album.

2018–present: Departure from YG and new works
On October 3, 2018, Epik High left YG Entertainment after six years. On February 19, 2019, Epik High signed to William Morris Endeavor. Epik High released their second EP, Sleepless in __, on March 11. The EP peaked at number 8 on the Gaon Album Chart and number 6 on the Billboard US World Album Chart. On October 22, 2020, the band posted a new video announcing their tenth album for January 2021. On December 28, 2020, Tablo announced that the group would release part 1 of their tenth album, Epik High Is Here, on January 18, 2021. The album's first single, "Rosario", featured CL and Zico.

On June 29, 2021, Epik High released the new single "Rain Song," featuring Colde. On October 25, 2021, Epik High released the new single "Face ID," which features Sik-K, Justhis, and Giriboy. The single serves as a pre-release for part two of Epik High Is Here. On January 12, 2022, it was revealed that Epik High would be performing at Coachella 2022, making them the first Korean act to be re-invited to the festival. On February 14, 2022, the group released part 2 of Epik High Is Here. On March 17, 2022, Epik High announced that it would be holding the 2022 'Epik High Is Here Encore' concert for three days from May 11 to 13.

On January 18, 2023, Epik High announced their third EP, Strawberry. It was released on February 1, 2023.

Discography

 Map of the Human Soul (2003)
 High Society (2004)
 Swan Songs (2005)
 Remapping the Human Soul (2007)
 Pieces, Part One (2008)
 Map the Soul (2009)
 (e) (2009)
 Epilogue (2010)
 99 (2012)
 Shoebox (2014)
 We've Done Something Wonderful (2017)
 Epik High Is Here (2021–2022)

Concert tours
Epik High Map The Soul USA Tour (2009)
Epik High Concert Parade Asia Tour (2014)
Epik High Japan Tour  Show Must Go On (2015)
Epik High North America Tour (2015)
Epik High Concert Legend 3 In Seoul (2015)
Epik High Japan Tour (2016)
Epik High Concert Now Playing (2016)
Epik High Comeback Concert "We've Done Something Wonderful" (2017)
EPIK HIGH 2019 European Tour (2019)
EPIK HIGH 2019 North American Tour (2019)
2019 EPIK HIGH in Singapore
Epik High Is Here North American Tour (2022)
Epik High Is Here Asia Pacific Tour (2022)
Epik High All Time High Tour Europe & North America (2023)

Awards and nominations

References

External links 

 

 
Korean Music Award winners
MAMA Award winners
Musical groups established in 2001
Musical groups from Seoul
South Korean hip hop record producers
South Korean hip hop groups
South Korean musical trios
Woollim Entertainment artists